Erik Meyer (born December 28, 1982) is a former professional American football quarterback. He was signed by the Cincinnati Bengals as an undrafted free agent in 2006. He played college football at Eastern Washington. He was also a member of the Cologne Centurions, Seattle Seahawks. Oakland Raiders, Utah Blaze, Hamilton Tiger-Cats, Spokane Shock, San Jose SaberCats and Washington Valor.

Early years
Meyer attended La Mirada High School in La Mirada, California, and was a student and a letterman in football and baseball. He was given the nickname of "Daddy" because he was always known to be a father figure to underclassmen, and his various positions in the community volunteering with children were highlighted at commencement when the school recognized him with the "George R. Shull Excellence in Care Scholarship," voted on by his graduating class and faculty at LMHS.

College career
Meyer was a record-setting quarterback for Eastern Washington University. He won the 2005 Walter Payton Award, presented by The Sports Network to the top offensive player in NCAA Division I-AA football. In 42 games, he completed 721 of 1097 passes for 10,261 yards, with 84 TD passes against just 17 INTs. His 166.5 career passing efficiency rating set a record for FCS quarterbacks with at least 400 completions. His career interception percentage (1.5) also is a Division I-AA record. He also broke eight Eastern Washington career records, five single-season marks, and one single-game mark. 
Erik, an avid weight lifter, was the lone skill position player to be a member of the 1200 pound club as a member of the EWU football team. His diligence led him to be inducted into the inaugural Iron Man Club, a plaque small in stature coined by a small fan Joey Dank. It still is a prominent fixture in the Eagle weight facility in Cheney, WA.
Notably, Meyer was recognized for excellence in the classroom during his four-year career at EWU. Erik was the recipient of the Joseph Helen Dankert Gold Scholar Award for maintaining a 3.8+ GPA during his time as an Eagle.

Professional career
Meyer was rated the eighth best quarterback in the 2006 NFL Draft by NFLDraftScout.com.

Cincinnati Bengals
Meyer went undrafted in the 2006 NFL Draft. He signed with the Cincinnati Bengals as an undrafted free agent and attended training camp hoping to contend for a roster spot. Meyer was released from the Bengals on August 28.

Cologne Centurions
In 2007, Meyer was the starting quarterback for the Cologne Centurions of NFL Europa before the league folded. He completed 141 of 205 passes for 1,612 yards, 13 touchdowns and 6 interceptions. He also rushed for 138 yards and 1 touchdown.

Seattle Seahawks
Meyer was signed by the Seattle Seahawks in July 2007. He competed against third-string Seahawk quarterback David Greene and free agent Derek Devine for the third-string job. Meyer was cut by the Seahawks on August 28, 2007.

Oakland Raiders
On March 24, 2008, Meyer was signed by the Oakland Raiders. He was waived on June 25, 2008 to make room for Sam Keller.

Hamilton Tiger-Cats
On February 24, 2009, Meyer was signed by the Hamilton Tiger-Cats. He was released on June 9, 2009.

Spokane Shock
Meyer was signed by the Spokane Shock on December 23, 2009. Meyer appeared in two games connecting on 18 of 28 passes for 274 yards, 5 touchdowns, and one interception.

Utah Blaze
Meyer signed with the Utah Blaze on September 22, 2010. Meyer was the backup to Tommy Grady.

Spokane Shock
Meyer was traded back to the Spokane Shock with Raymond McNeil for Khreem Smith and Antonio Narcisse on May 30, 2011. After spending 3 seasons as the backup to Kyle Rowley, Meyer was given a chance to start in 2013. Meyer responded by leading the league in touchdown passes, with 112. Meyer's 112 touchdowns and 4,667 passing yards, were both new Shock records. Meyer lead the Shock to a 14–4 record, clinching the #2 seed in the National Conference. Following the season, Meyer was named First-team All-Arena by the AFL. Meyer was recognized again by the AFL, earning Offensive Player of the Year and League MVP Awards. On December 16, 2013, Meyer was assigned to Spokane for the 2014 season.

San Jose SaberCats
On October 10, 2014, Meyer was assigned to the San Jose SaberCats. He helped the Sabercats to a 17–1 regular season record while earning Second-team All-Arena honors. The Sabercats won ArenaBowl XXVIII against the Jacksonville Sharks on August 29, 2015.

Washington Valor
Meyer was assigned to the Washington Valor in February 2017. On May 24, 2017, Meyer was placed on injured reserve. On July 3, 2017, it was announced that Meyer was retiring.

AFL statistics

Stats from ArenaFan:

Coaching career
In 2013, Meyer began coaching quarterbacks at Central Washington University. Meyer has been the quarterbacks coach at his alma mater, La Mirada High School since 2008. He has also spent time as the offensive coordinator at La Mirada. In 2017, Meyer became an offensive quality control coach for the California Golden Bears.

References

External links
Utah Blaze bio
California Golden Bears bio

1982 births
Living people
American football quarterbacks
California Golden Bears football coaches
Central Washington Wildcats football coaches
Cincinnati Bengals players
Cologne Centurions (NFL Europe) players
Eastern Washington Eagles football coaches
Eastern Washington Eagles football players
Hamilton Tiger-Cats players
Oakland Raiders players
San Jose SaberCats players
Seattle Seahawks players
Spokane Shock players
Sportspeople from Los Angeles County, California
Utah Blaze players
Washington Valor players
High school football coaches in California
Walter Payton Award winners
People from La Mirada, California
Players of American football from California